is a Japanese cyclist. He won the Silver Medal in the Men's team sprint in the 2004 Summer Olympics along with Toshiaki Fushimi and Masaki Inoue. In Japan, he is mostly known as a keirin cyclist.

References 

1978 births
Living people
Cyclists at the 2000 Summer Olympics
Cyclists at the 2004 Summer Olympics
Cyclists at the 2008 Summer Olympics
Olympic cyclists of Japan
Olympic silver medalists for Japan
Japanese male cyclists
Olympic medalists in cycling
Medalists at the 2004 Summer Olympics
Keirin cyclists
Japanese sportsperson-politicians
21st-century Japanese people